Anton Aleksandrovich Kochenkov (born 2 April 1987) is a Russian professional football player whose position is a goalkeeper. He plays for Arsenal Tula.

Club career
On 2 August 2021, he joined FC Arsenal Tula.

Honours
Lokomotiv Moscow
Russian Cup: 2016-17

Career statistics

Club

Honours

Club
Lokomotiv Moscow
Russian Premier League (1): 2017–18
Russian Cup (1): 2018–19

References

External links
 
 

1987 births
Sportspeople from Bishkek
Living people
Russian footballers
Association football goalkeepers
FC Nizhny Novgorod (2007) players
FC Volga Nizhny Novgorod players
FC Rostov players
PFC Spartak Nalchik players
FC Mordovia Saransk players
FC Lokomotiv Moscow players
FC Krasnodar players
FC Tom Tomsk players
FC Arsenal Tula players
Russian Premier League players
Russian First League players
Russian Second League players